An internal standard in analytical chemistry is a chemical substance that is added in a constant amount to samples, the blank and calibration standards in a chemical analysis. This substance can then be used for calibration by plotting the ratio of the analyte signal to the internal standard signal as a function of the analyte concentration of the standards. This is done to correct for the loss of analyte during sample preparation or sample inlet. The internal standard is a compound that is very similar, but not identical to the chemical species of interest in the samples, as the effects of sample preparation should, relative to the amount of each species, be the same for the signal from the internal standard as for the signal(s) from the species of interest in the ideal case. Adding known quantities of analyte(s) of interest is a distinct technique called standard addition, which is performed to correct for matrix effects.

This ratio for the samples is then used to obtain their analyte concentrations from a calibration curve. The internal standard used needs to provide a signal that is similar to the analyte signal in most ways but sufficiently different so that the two signals are readily distinguishable by the instrument. For example, deuterated chlorobenzene (C6D5Cl) is an internal standard used in the analysis of volatiles on GC-MS because it is similar to chlorobenzene but does not occur naturally. Norleucine is also a popular internal standard for the analysis of amino acids via GC-MS.

In NMR spectroscopy, e.g. of the nuclei 1H, 13C and 29Si, frequencies depend on the magnetic field, which is not the same across all experiments. Therefore, frequencies are reported as relative differences to the internal standard tetramethylsilane (TMS). This relative difference to TMS is called chemical shift, and measured in parts per million.

In practice, the difference between the signals of common solvents and TMS are known, and since modern instruments are capable of detecting the small quantities of protonated solvent present in commercial deuterated solvents no TMS need be added. By specifying the lock solvent to be used, modern spectrometers are able to correctly reference the sample; in effect, the solvent itself serves as the internal standard.

In chromatography, internal standards are used to determine the concentration of other analytes by calculating response factor. The internal standard selected should be again similar to the analyte and have a similar retention time and similar derivitization. It must be stable and must not interfere with the sample components.

In ICP-MS, internal standards commonly used are elements rarely found on natural samples, such as cerium, or artificial isotopes.

References

 Skoog, Douglas A. (1998). Principles of Instrumental Analysis: Introduction, pp. 18. Harcourt Brace. 
 

Analytical chemistry